"On était beau" is a song by french singer Louane. It was released on 30 June 2017 as the lead single from her second studio album Louane. The song has peaked at number nine on the French Singles Chart.

Charts

Weekly charts

Year-end charts

Certifications

References

2017 singles
2017 songs
French-language songs
Louane (singer) songs